This is a list of airports in Tonga, sorted by location.

Tonga, officially the Kingdom of Tonga, is an archipelago in the South Pacific Ocean, consisting of 169 islands, 36 of them inhabited. The islands that constitute the archipelago lie south of Samoa, about one-third of the way from New Zealand to Hawaii.



Airports

See also 
 Transport in Tonga
 List of airports by ICAO code: N#NF - Fiji, Tonga
 Wikipedia:WikiProject Aviation/Airline destination lists: Oceania#Tonga

References 
 
  - includes IATA codes
 Great Circle Mapper: Airports in Tonga - IATA and ICAO codes
 World Aero Data: Airports in Tonga - ICAO codes

External links 
Lists of airports in Tonga:
Aircraft Charter World
The Airport Guide
FallingRain.com

Tonga
 
Airports
Airport
Tonga